The 2017 ASUN Conference baseball tournament was held at Melching Field at Conrad Park on the campus of Stetson University in DeLand, Florida, from May 24 through 27.  Third seeded  won their first championship and claimed the ASUN Conference's automatic bid to the 2017 NCAA Division I baseball tournament.

This was the conference's first baseball tournament held under its current "ASUN" brand name, which was adopted at the start of the 2016–17 school year.

Format and seeding
The 2017 tournament was a double-elimination tournament in which the top six conference members participated.  Seeds were determined based on conference winning percentage from the round-robin regular season.

Bracket and results

All-Tournament Team
The following players were named to the All-Tournament Team.

Most Valuable PLayer
Marc Coffers was named Tournament Most Valuable Player.  Coffers was an outfielder for Florida Gulf Coast.

References

ASUN Conference Baseball Tournament
Tournament
ASUN Conference baseball tournament
ASUN baseball tournament